The Pilgrim (Il pellegrino) is a bronze sculpture by Marino Marini.

Cast in 1939, it is in The Lillie and Hugh Roy Cullen Sculpture Garden, Museum of Fine Arts, Houston.

This work is an early example of the artist's development of his horse and rider theme.

See also
 List of public art in Houston

References

External links
Photo on Flickr
Closeup photo on Flickr
Photo on Picasaweb

Bronze sculptures in the United States
Buildings and structures in Houston
Culture of Houston
Equestrian statues in Texas
Lillie and Hugh Roy Cullen Sculpture Garden
1939 sculptures
Statues in Houston